Desmond Miller Hiscutt (born 5 March 1933) is an Australian former politician.

He was born in Burnie, Tasmania. In 1995, he was elected to the Tasmanian Legislative Council as the independent member for West Devon, succeeding his brother Hugh. West Devon was renamed Emu Bay in 1997, but the seat was abolished in 1999 and Hiscutt was defeated in his run for the seat of Murchison. His niece by marriage, Leonie Hiscutt is a sitting member of the Tasmanian parliament.

References

1933 births
Living people
Independent members of the Parliament of Tasmania
Members of the Tasmanian Legislative Council
20th-century Australian politicians